Georgios Xenidis (6 December 1974 – 3 June 2019) was a Greek football player who played as a defender.

Club career
Xenidis started his football career at the academy of Iraklis before being promoted to the men's team in the summer of 1994 where he played mostly as a left-back. In January 2002 he was transferred to AEK Athens, where he played for the rest of the season and since he wasn't able to establish himself in the team due to the hard competition, he returned to Iraklis in the following summer. In 2004 he moved to Cyprus in order to play for Anorthosis Famagusta, where he played for 2 seasons. Afterwards Xenidis returned to Greece to join Ionikos, where he was relegated to the second division after the end of the season. He played a season in the second division before retiring in July 2008.

Death
Xenidis died after a heart attack. Reports claimed that the veteran footballer felt sick and suffered a heart attack, without being able to receive medical care in time.

References

1974 births
2019 deaths
Greek footballers
Iraklis Thessaloniki F.C. players
AEK Athens F.C. players
Anorthosis Famagusta F.C. players
Ionikos F.C. players
Cypriot First Division players
Association football defenders
Greek expatriate footballers
Expatriate footballers in Cyprus
Greek expatriate sportspeople in Cyprus
Super League Greece players
Footballers from Thessaloniki